Yuyu (Yirau) is an extinct language or dialect cluster of southern South Australia. Walsh treats Yuyu as a language with Ngawait, Erawirung, Ngintait, and Ngarkat as dialects; Berndt and Berndt (1993) list those as dialects related to Yuyu.

References

Lower Murray languages
Extinct languages of South Australia